Siyāhnamā'ī, literally "portraying in black", is a derogatory term used by Iranian conservative critics to disparage Iranian films that allegedly convey a negative image of the country.

Definition
Some Iranian critics, most notably Massoud Farasati, believe that films portraying "a gloomy and dark image of social conditions under the Islamic Republic, or an exotic and primitive image of Iranians in rural settings" only seek to win awards in the Western film festivals. Some Iranian diaspora and government officials also hold such a reading. Not all Iranian critics, however, agree on this point. Houshang Golmakani is among critics who do not maintain this idea. 

Some notable filmmakers in Iran are accused of having such an agenda, like Asghar Farhadi and Jafar Panahi. Panahi has answered the accusations in Taxi (2015), saying “There are realities they don’t want shown... They don’t want to show it, but they do it themselves”.

References 

Persian words and phrases
Pejorative terms
Political terminology of Iran
Cinema of Iran
2000s neologisms